Słupsk railway station is a PKP and a PR railway station in Słupsk (Pomeranian Voivodeship), Poland. It is a junction station, the railway line No. 202 from Gdańsk Główny to Stargard intersects here with the railway line No. 405, connecting the station with Ustka.

According to the classification in terms of number of train passengers; Słupsk is a category B station.

Station building
The station building was built in 1990–91 and was opened on 10 January 1991. There are eight ticket offices in the building, available all day.

History
The first railway line reached Słupsk in 1869 from Gdańsk. Soon after, workshops were opened in the city. In 1945 the Soviet army destroyed the central part of the station building as a result of artillery fire.
On 27 May 1945 the railway connection with Lębork was opened. In subsequent weeks Słupsk gained connections with Ustka, Koszalin, Kołobrzeg, Białogard and Szczecinek. In 1988 and 1989, electrified traction reached the city.

The station served as the westernmost terminus of the SKM Tricity commuter rail line between 2007 and 9 December 2017, when it was cut back to Lębork.

Lines crossing the station

Rail links
 Białogard (REGIO, TLK)
 Białystok (TLK)
 Gdańsk Główny (PR, TLK)
 Gdynia Główna (PR, TLK)
 Katowice (TLK)
 Kołobrzeg (TLK)
 Koszalin (REGIO, TLK)
 Kraków Główny  (TLK)
 Miastko (REGIO)
 Olsztyn Główny (TLK)
 Poznań Główny (TLK)
 Rumia (PR)
 Szczecin Główny (REGIO, TLK)
 Ustka (REGIO)
 Wejherowo (PR, TLK)

Train services

The station is served by the following services:

Express Intercity Premium services (EIP) Kołobrzeg - Gdynia - Warsaw - Kraków
 Intercity services (IC) Łódź Fabryczna — Warszawa — Gdańsk Glowny — Kołobrzeg
Intercity services (IC) Szczecin - Koszalin - Słupsk - Gdynia - Gdańsk
Intercity services (IC) Szczecin - Koszalin - Słupsk - Gdynia - Gdańsk - Elbląg/Iława - Olsztyn
Intercity services (IC) Szczecin - Koszalin - Słupsk - Gdynia - Gdańsk - Elbląg - Olsztyn - Białystok
Intercity services (IC) Ustka - Koszalin - Poznań - Wrocław - Opole - Bielsko-Biała
Intercity services (IC) Ustka - Koszalin - Poznań - Wrocław - Katowice - Kraków - Rzeszów - Przemyśl
Intercity services (IC) Słupsk - Koszalin - Poznań - Wrocław
Intercity services (IC) Słupsk - Koszalin - Poznań - Wrocław - Opole - Katowice
Intercity services (TLK) Kołobrzeg — Gdynia Główna — Warszawa Wschodnia — Kraków Główny
Direction of Gdynia
Regional services (R) Tczew — Słupsk  
Regional services (R) Malbork — Słupsk  
Regional services (R) Elbląg — Słupsk  
Regional services (R) Słupsk — Bydgoszcz Główna 
Regional services (R) Słupsk — Gdynia Główna
Direction of Szczecin
Regional services (R) Słupsk — Koszalin
Regional services (R) Słupsk — Koszalin — Kołobrzeg
Regional services (R) Słupsk — Koszalin — Szczecin Główny
Regional services(R) Słupsk — Darłowo
Direction of Ustka
Regional services (R) Słupsk — Ustka Uroczysko
Direction of Szczecinek
Regional services (R) Słupsk — Miastko
Regional services (R) Słupsk — Miastko — Szczecinek
Regional services (R) Słupsk — Miastko — Szczecinek — Chojnice

References 

Słupsk article at Polish Stations Database, URL accessed at 8 March 2006
Słupsk official web-site, URL accessed at 16 March 2006

External links

Railway stations in Pomeranian Voivodeship
Buildings and structures in Słupsk
Railway stations in Poland opened in 1869